The 1983–84 Georgia Tech Yellow Jackets men's basketball team represented the Georgia Institute of Technology. Led by head coach Bobby Cremins, the team finished the season with an overall record of 18–11 (6–8 ACC).

Roster

Schedule and results 

|-
!colspan=9 style=| Regular Season

|-
!colspan=9 style=| ACC Tournament

|-
!colspan=9 style=| National Invitation Tournament

References 

Georgia Tech Yellow Jackets men's basketball seasons
Georgia Tech
1983 in sports in Georgia (U.S. state)
1984 in sports in Georgia (U.S. state)